Nika Neparidze is a Georgian rugby union player. He plays as Tighthead Prop for ASM espoirs in Top 14.

References

External links
 

1996 births
Living people
ASM Clermont Auvergne players
Rugby union players from Georgia (country)
Rugby union props